Medicago rotata is a species of flowering plant in the Fabaceae family. It is found throughout the eastern Mediterranean from Turkey to Israel. It forms a symbiotic relationship with the bacterium Sinorhizobium medicae, which is capable of nitrogen fixation.

Gallery

References

External links
 International Legume Database & Information Services

rotata
Taxa named by Pierre Edmond Boissier